Perry Young (born August 4, 1963) is an American former professional basketball shooting guard who played one season in the National Basketball Association (NBA) with the Portland Trail Blazers and the Chicago Bulls during the 1986–87 season. He was drafted by the Trail Blazers during the third round (61st pick overall) in the 1985 NBA draft from Virginia Polytechnic Institute and State University.

Professional career
Originally from Baltimore, Maryland, Young started his career in 1985 with the Maine Windjammers in the Continental Basketball Association. He then finished the season with the Bay State Bombardiers, playing 11 postseason games, averaging 19.9 points, 6 rebounds and 3.4 assists in 37.5 minutes per game. He started the 1986–1987 season with the Wyoming Wildcatters, another CBA franchise, and played 25 games with the team, averaging 15.6 points, 3.7 rebounds and 3.4 assists before being called up in the National Basketball Association by the Chicago Bulls. He also appeared for the Portland Trail Blazers during the season. 

In 1987 he had a stint in the United States Basketball League, playing for the Jersey Jammers; he then joined the Charleston Gunners in the CBA, and he transferred mid-season to the Quad City Thunder. He played two seasons with the Thunder (1988–89 and 1989–90), and in 1989 he also played for the Calgary 88's of the World Basketball League, leading the league in blocks with 1.33 blocks per game. After his appearances in the WBL he played two more seasons in the CBA, one with the Oklahoma City Cavalry and one with the Tri-City Chinook.

References

External links

College stats at Sports-reference.com

1963 births
Living people
American expatriate basketball people in Canada
American expatriate basketball people in the Philippines
American men's basketball players
Basketball players from Baltimore
Bay State Bombardiers players
Charleston Gunners players
Chicago Bulls players
Oklahoma City Cavalry players
Philippine Basketball Association imports
Portland Trail Blazers draft picks
Portland Trail Blazers players
Quad City Thunder players
Shell Turbo Chargers players
Shooting guards
Tri-City Chinook players
Virginia Tech Hokies men's basketball players
Wyoming Wildcatters players